Reidar Ødegaard (24 November 1901 – 11 April 1972) was a Norwegian cross-country skier who competed in the 1920s. He won a bronze in the 18 km event at the 1928 Winter Olympics in St. Moritz.

He participated in the demonstration event, military patrol (precursor to biathlon), in the 1928 Winter Olympics.

Cross-country skiing results
All results are sourced from the International Ski Federation (FIS).

Olympic Games
 1 medal – (1 bronze)

World Championships

References

External links
 
 
 Reidar Ødegaard at databaseOlympics 

1901 births
1972 deaths
Cross-country skiers at the 1928 Winter Olympics
Military patrol competitors at the 1928 Winter Olympics
Norwegian military patrol (sport) runners
Norwegian male cross-country skiers
Olympic bronze medalists for Norway
Olympic biathletes of Norway
Olympic cross-country skiers of Norway
Olympic medalists in cross-country skiing
Medalists at the 1928 Winter Olympics